The 1982 Montana State Bobcats football team was an American football team that represented Montana State University in the Big Sky Conference during the 1982 NCAA Division I-AA football season. In their only season under head coach Doug Graber, the Bobcats compiled a 6–5 record (5–2 in Big Sky, tied for first).

Schedule

References

Montana State
Montana State Bobcats football seasons
Montana State Bobcats football